The 2020 Maine House of Representatives elections took place on November 3, 2020 alongside the biennial United States elections. Maine voters elected members of the Maine House of Representatives via plurality voting in all 151 of the state house's districts, as well as a non-voting member from the Passamaquoddy Tribe.

The election was also held alongside elections for the Maine Senate.

State representatives serve two-year terms in the Maine State House.

Predictions

Summary of results
Italics denote an open seat held by the incumbent party, bold text denotes a gain for a party. 
{| class="sortable wikitable" style="font-size:95%;line-height:14px;"
! class="unsortable"| State House District
! class="unsortable"|Incumbent
! colspan="2"| Party
! class="unsortable"|Elected Representative
! colspan="2"| Party
|-
| 1st
| Deane Rykerson
| style="background:;"|
| Dem
| Kristi Mathieson
| style="background:;"|
| Dem
|-
| 2nd
| Michele Meyer
| style="background:;"|
| Dem
| Michele Meyer| style="background:;"|
| Dem
|-
| 3rd
| Lydia Blume
| style="background:;"|
| Dem
| Lydia Blume
| style="background:;"|
| Dem
|-
| 4th
| Patricia Hymanson
| style="background:;"|
| Dem
| Patricia Hymanson
| style="background:;"|
| Dem
|-
| 5th
| Beth O'Connor
| style="background:;"|
| Rep
| Beth O'Connor
| style="background:;"|
| Rep
|-
| 6th
| Tiffany Roberts-Lovell
| style="background:;"|
| Dem
| Tiffany Roberts-Lovell
| style="background:;"|
| Dem
|-
| 7th
| Daniel Hobbs
| style="background:;"|
| Dem
| Timothy Roche
| style="background:;"|
| Rep
|-
| 8th
| Christopher Babbidge
| style="background:;"|
| Dem
| Christopher Babbidge
| style="background:;"|
| Dem
|-
| 9th
| Diane Denk
| style="background:;"|
| Dem
| Traci Gere| style="background:;"|
| Dem
|-
| 10th
| Henry Ingwersen
| style="background:;"|
| Dem
| Wayne Parry
| style="background:;"|
| Rep
|-
| 11th
| Ryan Fecteau
| style="background:;"|
| Dem
| Ryan Fecteau
| style="background:;"|
| Dem
|-
| 12th
| Victoria Foley
| style="background:;"|
| Ind
| Erin Sheehan
| style="background:;"|
| Dem
|-
| 13th
| Lori Gramlich
| style="background:;"|
| Dem
| Lori Gramlich
| style="background:;"|
| Dem
|-
| 14th
| Donna Bailey
| style="background:;"|
| Dem
| Lynn Copeland| style="background:;"|
| Dem|-
| 15th
| Margaret M. O'Neil
| style="background:;"|
| Dem
| Margaret M. O'Neil
| style="background:;"|
| Dem
|-
| 16th
| Donald G. Marean
| style="background:;"|
| Rep
| Nathan Carlow| style="background:;"|
| Rep|-
| 17th
| Dwayne W. Prescott
| style="background:;"|
| Rep
| Dwayne W. Prescott
| style="background:;"|
| Rep
|-
| 18th
| Anne-Marie Mastraccio
| style="background:;"|
| Dem
| John Tuttle| style="background:;"|
| Dem|-
| 19th
| Matthew Harrington
| style="background:;"|
| Rep
| Matthew Harrington
| style="background:;"|
| Rep
|-
| 20th
| Theodore Kryzak
| style="background:;"|
| Rep
| Theodore Kryzak
| style="background:;"|
| Rep
|-
| 21st
| Heidi H. Sampson
| style="background:;"|
| Rep
| Heidi H. Sampson
| style="background:;"|
| Rep
|-
| 22nd
| Mark Blier
| style="background:;"|
| Rep
| Mark Blier
| style="background:;"|
| Rep
|-
| 23rd
| Lester Ordway
| style="background:;"|
| Rep
| Lester Ordway
| style="background:;"|
| Rep
|-
| 24th
| Mark Bryant
| style="background:;"|
| Dem
| Mark Bryant
| style="background:;"|
| Dem
|-
| 25th
| Patrick Corey
| style="background:;"|
| Rep
| Patrick Corey
| style="background:;"|
| Rep
|-
| 26th
| Maureen Fitzgerald Terry
| style="background:;"|
| Dem
| Maureen Fitzgerald Terry
| style="background:;"|
| Dem
|-
| 27th
| Andrew McLean
| style="background:;"|
| Dem
| Kyle Bailey| style="background:;"|
| Dem|-
| 28th
| Chrostopher Caiazzo
| style="background:;"|
| Dem
| Christopher Caiazzo
| style="background:;"|
| Dem
|-
| 29th
| Shawn Babine
| style="background:;"|
| Dem
| Sophia Warren
| style="background:;"|
| Ind
|-
| 30th
| Anne Carney
| style="background:;"|
| Dem
| Rebecca Millett| style="background:;"|
| Dem|-
| 31st
| Lois Galgay Reckitt
| style="background:;"|
| Dem
| Lois Galgay Reckitt
| style="background:;"|
| Dem
|-
| 32nd
| Christopher Kessler
| style="background:;"|
| Dem
| Christopher Kessler
| style="background:;"|
| Dem
|-
| 33rd
| Victoria Morales
| style="background:;"|
| Dem
| Victoria Morales
| style="background:;"|
| Dem
|-
| 34th
| Andrew Gattine
| style="background:;"|
| Dem
| Morgan Rielly| style="background:;"|
| Dem|-
| 35th
| colspan=3 align=center|Vacant| Suzanne Salisbury| style="background:;"|
| Dem|-
| 36th
| Michael Brennan
| style="background:;"|
| Dem
| Michael Brennan
| style="background:;"|
| Dem
|-
| 37th
| Richard Farnsworth
| style="background:;"|
| Dem
| Grayson Lookner| style="background:;"|
| Dem|-
| 38th
| Matthew Moonen
| style="background:;"|
| Dem
| Barbara Wood| style="background:;"|
| Dem|-
| 39th
| Michael A. Sylvester
| style="background:;"|
| Dem
| Michael A. Sylvester
| style="background:;"|
| Dem
|-
| 40th
| Rachel Talbot Ross
| style="background:;"|
| Dem
| Rachel Talbot Ross
| style="background:;"|
| Dem
|-
| 41st
| Erik Jorgensen
| style="background:;"|
| Dem
| Samuel Zager| style="background:;"|
| Dem|-
| 42nd
| Benjamin Collings
| style="background:;"|
| Dem
| Benjamin Collings
| style="background:;"|
| Dem
|-
| 43rd
| W. Edward Crockett
| style="background:;"|
| Dem
| W. Edward Crockett
| style="background:;"|
| Dem
|-
| 44th
| Teresa Pierce
| style="background:;"|
| Dem
| Teresa Pierce
| style="background:;"|
| Dem
|-
| 45th
| Dale J. Denno
| style="background:;"|
| Dem
| Stephen Moriarty| style="background:;"|
| Dem|-
| 46th
| Braden Sharpe
| style="background:;"|
| Dem
| Braden Sharpe
| style="background:;"|
| Dem
|-
| 47th
| Janice Cooper
| style="background:;"|
| Dem
| Arthur Bell| style="background:;"|
| Dem|-
| 48th
| Sara Gideon
| style="background:;"|
| Dem
| Melanie Sachs| style="background:;"|
| Dem|-
| 49th
| Mattie Daughtry
| style="background:;"|
| Dem
| Poppy Arford| style="background:;"|
| Dem|-
| 50th
| Ralph Tucker
| style="background:;"|
| Dem
| Ralph Tucker
| style="background:;"|
| Dem
|-
| 51st
| Joyce McCreight
| style="background:;"|
| Dem
| Joyce McCreight
| style="background:;"|
| Dem
|-
| 52nd
| Jennifer DeChant
| style="background:;"|
| Dem
| Sean Paulhus| style="background:;"|
| Dem|-
| 53rd
| Allison Hepler
| style="background:;"|
| Dem
| Allison Hepler
| style="background:;"|
| Dem
|-
| 54th
| Denise Tepler
| style="background:;"|
| Dem
| Denise Tepler
| style="background:;"|
| Dem
|-
| 55th
| Seth Berry
| style="background:;"|
| Dem
| Seth Berry
| style="background:;"|
| Dem
|-
| 56th
| Rick Mason
| style="background:;"|
| Rep
| Rick Mason
| style="background:;"|
| Rep
|-
| 57th
| Thomas Martin
| style="background:;"|
| Rep
| Thomas Martin
| style="background:;"|
| Rep
|-
| 58th
| James R. Handy
| style="background:;"|
| Dem
| Jonathan Connor
| style="background:;"|
| Rep
|-
| 59th
| Margaret Craven
| style="background:;"|
| Dem
| Margaret Craven
| style="background:;"|
| Dem
|-
| 60th
| Kristen Cloutier
| style="background:;"|
| Dem
| Kristen Cloutier
| style="background:;"|
| Dem
|-
| 61st
| Heidi Brooks
| style="background:;"|
| Dem
| Heidi Brooks
| style="background:;"|
| Dem
|-
| 62nd
| Gina Melaragno
| style="background:;"|
| Dem
| Gina Melaragno
| style="background:;"|
| Dem
|-
| 63rd
| Bruce Bickford
| style="background:;"|
| Rep
| Bruce Bickford
| style="background:;"|
| Rep
|-
| 64th
| Bettyann Sheats
| style="background:;"|
| Dem
| Laurel Libby
| style="background:;"|
| Rep
|-
| 65th
| Amy Arata
| style="background:;"|
| Rep
| Amy Arata
| style="background:;"|
| Rep
|-
| 66th
| Jessica L. Fay
| style="background:;"|
| Dem
| Jessica L. Fay
| style="background:;"|
| Dem
|-
| 67th
| Susan Austin
| style="background:;"|
| Rep
| Susan Austin
| style="background:;"|
| Rep
|-
| 68th
| Richard Cebra
| style="background:;"|
| Rep
| Richard Cebra
| style="background:;"|
| Rep
|-
| 69th
| Walter Riseman
| style="background:;"|
| Ind
| Walter Riseman
| style="background:;"|
| Ind
|-
| 70th
| Nathan Wadsworth
| style="background:;"|
| Rep
| Nathan Wadsworth
| style="background:;"|
| Rep
|-
| 71st
| H. Sawin Millett
| style="background:;"|
| Rep
| H. Sawin Millett
| style="background:;"|
| Rep
|-
| 72nd
| Kathleen Dillingham
| style="background:;"|
| Rep
| Kathleen Dillingham
| style="background:;"|
| Rep
|-
| 73rd
| John Andrews
| style="background:;"|
| Rep
| John Andrews
| style="background:;"|
| Rep
|-
| 74th
| Christina Riley
| style="background:;"|
| Dem
| Sheila Lyman
| style="background:;"|
| Rep
|-
| 75th
| Joshua Morris
| style="background:;"|
| Rep
| Joshua Morris
| style="background:;"|
| Rep
|-
| 76th
| Dennis Keschl
| style="background:;"|
| Rep
| Daniel Newman| style="background:;"|
| Rep|-
| 77th
| Michael D. Perkins
| style="background:;"|
| Rep
| Michael D. Perkins
| style="background:;"|
| Rep
|-
| 78th
| Catherine Nadeau
| style="background:;"|
| Dem
| Cathy Nadeau
| style="background:;"|
| Rep
|-
| 79th
| Timothy Theriault
| style="background:;"|
| Rep
| Timothy Theriault
| style="background:;"|
| Rep
|-
| 80th
| Richard T. Bradstreet
| style="background:;"|
| Rep
| Richard T. Bradstreet
| style="background:;"|
| Rep
|-
| 81st
| Craig Hickman
| style="background:;"|
| Dem
| Tavis Hasenfus| style="background:;"|
| Dem|-
| 82nd
| Kent Ackley
| style="background:;"|
| Ind
| Randall Greenwood
| style="background:;"|
| Rep
|-
| 83rd
| Thomas Harnett
| style="background:;"|
| Dem
| Thomas Harnett
| style="background:;"|
| Dem
|-
| 84th
| Charlotte Warren
| style="background:;"|
| Dem
| Charlotte Warren
| style="background:;"|
| Dem
|-
| 85th
| Donna Doore
| style="background:;"|
| Dem
| Donna Doore
| style="background:;"|
| Dem
|-
| 86th
| Justin Fecteau
| style="background:;"|
| Rep
| Justin Fecteau
| style="background:;"|
| Rep
|-
| 87th
| Jeffery Hanley
| style="background:;"|
| Rep
| Jeffery Hanley
| style="background:;"|
| Rep
|-
| 88th
| Chloe Maxmin
| style="background:;"|
| Dem
| Michael Lemelin
| style="background:;"|
| Rep
|-
| 89th
| Holly Stover
| style="background:;"|
| Dem
| Holly Stover
| style="background:;"|
| Dem
|-
| 90th
| Michael Devin
| style="background:;"|
| Dem
| Lydia Crafts| style="background:;"|
| Dem|-
| 91st
| Jeffrey Evangelos
| style="background:;"|
| Ind
| Jeffrey Evangelos
| style="background:;"|
| Ind
|-
| 92nd
| Ann Matlak
| style="background:;"|
| Dem
| Ann Matlack
| style="background:;"|
| Dem
|-
| 93rd
| Anne Beebe-Center
| style="background:;"|
| Dem
| Valli Geiger| style="background:;"|
| Dem|-
| 94th
| Victoria Doudera
| style="background:;"|
| Dem
| Victoria Doudera
| style="background:;"|
| Dem
|-
| 95th
| William Pluecker
| style="background:;"|
| Ind
| William Pluecker
| style="background:;"|
| Ind
|-
| 96th
| Stanley Zeigler
| style="background:;"|
| Dem
| Stanley Zeigler
| style="background:;"|
| Dem
|-
| 97th
| Janice Dodge
| style="background:;"|
| Dem
| Janice Dodge
| style="background:;"|
| Dem
|-
| 98th
| Scott Cuddy
| style="background:;"|
| Dem
| Scott Cuddy
| style="background:;"|
| Dem
|-
| 99th
| MaryAnne Kinney
| style="background:;"|
| Rep
| MaryAnne Kinney
| style="background:;"|
| Rep
|-
| 100th
| Danny Costain
| style="background:;"|
| Rep
| Danny Costain
| style="background:;"|
| Rep
|-
| 101st
| David G. Haggan
| style="background:;"|
| Rep
| David G. Haggan
| style="background:;"|
| Rep
|-
| 102nd
| Abigail Griffin
| style="background:;"|
| Rep
| Abigail Griffin
| style="background:;"|
| Rep
|-
| 103rd
| Roger E. Reed
| style="background:;"|
| Rep
| James Thorne| style="background:;"|
| Rep|-
| 104th
| Steven Foster
| style="background:;"|
| Rep
| Steven Foster
| style="background:;"|
| Rep
|-
| 105th
| Joel Stetkis
| style="background:;"|
| Rep
| Joel Stetkis
| style="background:;"|
| Rep
|-
| 106th
| Scott Walter Strom
| style="background:;"|
| Rep
| Amanda Collamore| style="background:;"|
| Rep|-
| 107th
| Betty Austin
| style="background:;"|
| Dem
| Jennifer Poirier
| style="background:;"|
| Rep
|-
| 108th
| Shelley Rudnicki
| style="background:;"|
| Rep
| Shelley Rudnicki
| style="background:;"|
| Rep
|-
| 109th
| Bruce White
| style="background:;"|
| Dem
| Bruce White
| style="background:;"|
| Dem
|-
| 110th
| Colleen Madigan
| style="background:;"|
| Dem
| Colleen Madigan
| style="background:;"|
| Dem
|-
| 111th
| Philip Curtis
| style="background:;"|
| Rep
| John Ducharme| style="background:;"|
| Rep|-
| 112th
| Thomas Skolfield
| style="background:;"|
| Rep
| Thomas Skolfield
| style="background:;"|
| Rep
|-
| 113th
| H. Scott Landry
| style="background:;"|
| Dem
| H. Scott Landry
| style="background:;"|
| Dem
|-
| 114th
| Randall Hall
| style="background:;"|
| Rep
| Randall Hall
| style="background:;"|
| Rep
|-
| 115th
| Josanne Doloff
| style="background:;"|
| Rep
| Josanne Dolloff
| style="background:;"|
| Rep
|-
| 116th
| Richard Pickett
| style="background:;"|
| Rep
| Richard Pickett
| style="background:;"|
| Rep
|-
| 117th
| Frances Head
| style="background:;"|
| Rep
| Frances Head
| style="background:;"|
| Rep
|-
| 118th
| Chad Wayne Grignon
| style="background:;"|
| Rep
| Chad Wayne Grignon
| style="background:;"|
| Rep
|-
| 119th
| Paul Stearns
| style="background:;"|
| Rep
| Paul Stearns
| style="background:;"|
| Rep
|-
| 120th
| Norman Higgins
| style="background:;"|
| Ind
| Richard Evans
| style="background:;"|
| Dem
|-
| 121st
| Gary Drinkwater
| style="background:;"|
| Rep
| Gary Drinkwater
| style="background:;"|
| Rep
|-
| 122nd
| Michelle Dunphy
| style="background:;"|
| Dem
| Michelle Dunphy
| style="background:;"|
| Dem
|-
| 123rd
| Ryan Tipping
| style="background:;"|
| Dem
| Laurie Osher| style="background:;"|
| Dem|-
| 124th
| Aaron Frey
| style="background:;"|
| Dem
| Joseph Perry| style="background:;"|
| Dem|-
| 125th
| Victoria Kornfield
| style="background:;"|
| Dem
| Amy Roeder| style="background:;"|
| Dem|-
| 126th
| John Schneck
| style="background:;"|
| Dem
| Laura Supica| style="background:;"|
| Dem|-
| 127th
| Barbara A. Cardone
| style="background:;"|
| Dem
| Barbara A. Cardone
| style="background:;"|
| Dem
|-
| 128th
| Arthur Verow
| style="background:;"|
| Dem
| Kevin O'Connell| style="background:;"|
| Dem|-
| 129th
| Peter Lyford
| style="background:;"|
| Rep
| Peter Lyford
| style="background:;"|
| Rep
|-
| 130th
| Richard Campbell
| style="background:;"|
| Rep
| Kathy Downes| style="background:;"|
| Rep|-
| 131st
| Sherman Hutchins
| style="background:;"|
| Rep
| Sherman Hutchins
| style="background:;"|
| Rep
|-
| 132nd
| Nicole Grohoski
| style="background:;"|
| Dem
| Nicole Grohoski
| style="background:;"|
| Dem
|-
| 133rd
| Sarah Pebworth
| style="background:;"|
| Dem
| Sarah Pebworth
| style="background:;"|
| Dem
|-
| 134th
| Genevieve McDonald
| style="background:;"|
| Dem
| Genevieve McDonald
| style="background:;"|
| Dem
|-
| 135th
| Brian Hubbell
| style="background:;"|
| Dem
| Lynne Williams| style="background:;"|
| Dem|-
| 136th
| William Faulkingham
| style="background:;"|
| Rep
| William Faulkingham
| style="background:;"|
| Rep
|-
| 137th
| Lawrence Lockman
| style="background:;"|
| Rep
| Meldon Carmichael| style="background:;"|
| Rep|-
| 138th
| Robert Alley
| style="background:;"|
| Dem
| Robert Alley
| style="background:;"|
| Dem
|-
| 139th
| William Tuell
| style="background:;"|
| Rep
| William Tuell
| style="background:;"|
| Rep
|-
| 140th
| Anne C. Perry
| style="background:;"|
| Dem
| Anne C. Perry
| style="background:;"|
| Dem
|-
| 141st
| Kathy Javner
| style="background:;"|
| Rep
| Kathy Javner
| style="background:;"|
| Rep
|-
| 142nd
| Sheldon Hanington
| style="background:;"|
| Rep
| Jeffery Gifford| style="background:;"|
| Rep|-
| 143rd
| Stephen Stanley
| style="background:;"|
| Dem
| Peggy Stanley
| style="background:;"|
| Rep
|-
| 144th
| Gregory Swallow
| style="background:;"|
| Rep
| Tracy Quint 
| style="background:;"|
| Rep|-
| 145th
| Chris Johansen
| style="background:;"|
| Rep
| Chris Johansen
| style="background:;"|
| Rep
|-
| 146th
| Dustin White
| style="background:;"|
| Rep
| Dustin White
| style="background:;"|
| Rep
|-
| 147th
| Harold L. Stewart III
| style="background:;"|
| Rep
| Joseph Underwood| style="background:;"|
| Rep|-
| 148th
| David Harold McCrea
| style="background:;"|
| Dem
| David Harold McCrea
| style="background:;"|
| Dem
|-
| 149th
| John DeVeau
| style="background:;"|
| Rep
| Susan Bernard| style="background:;"|
| Rep|-
| 150th
| Roland Martin
| style="background:;"|
| Dem
| Roland Martin
| style="background:;"|
| Dem
|-
| 151st
| John L. Martin
| style="background:;"|
| Dem
| John L. Martin
| style="background:;"|
| Dem
|-
| colspan="7"|Non-Voting Members
|-
| Passamaquoddy
| Rena Newell
| style="background:;"|
| NVT
| Rena Newell
| style="background:;"|
| NVT
|-
| Maliseet
| N/A
| 
| 
| 
| 
| 
|-
|}
Sources: Incumbents-2018 Maine House of Representatives election; Winners

 Closest races 
Seats where the margin of victory was under 10%:

Incumbents not seeking reelection
Term-limited incumbents
22 incumbent representatives (eighteen Democrats, three Republicans and one independent) were term-limited and constitutionally prevented from seeking a fifth consecutive term.

Richard Campbell (R), District 130
Janice Cooper (D), District 47
Mattie Daughtry (D), District 49 (Ran for State Senate)Michael Devin (D), District 90
Richard Farnsworth (D), District 37
Drew Gattine (D), District 34
Sara Gideon (D), District 48 (Ran for U.S. Senate)Craig Hickman (D), District 81
Brian Hubbell (D), District 135
Erik Jorgensen (D), District 41
Victoria Kornfield (D), District 125 (Ran for State Senate)Lawrence Lockman (R), District 137
Donald Marean (I), District 16
Anne-Marie Mastraccio (D), District 18
Andrew McLean (D), District 27
Matthew Moonen (D), District 38
Catherine Nadeau (D), District 78
Roger Reed (R), District 103
Deane Rykerson (D), District 1
John Schneck (D), District 126
Stephen Stanley (D), District 143
Ryan Tipping (D), District 123

Retiring incumbents
Eight incumbent representatives were eligible to seek another term but chose not to.
Anne Beebe-Center (D), District 93
Anne Carney (D), District 20 (Ran for State Senate)Philip Curtis (R), District 111
Diane Denk (D), District 9
Sheldon Hanington (R), District 142
Chloe Maxmin (D), District 88 (Ran for State Senate)Harold Stewart (R), District 147 (Ran for State Senate)''
Scott Strom (R), District 106

Defeated incumbents

In primary
One incumbent representative sought reelection but was defeated in the primary election.
John DeVeau (R), District 149

In general
Nine incumbent representatives sought reelection but were defeated in the general election.
Kent Ackley (I), District 82
Betty Austin (D), District 107
Shawn Babine (D), District 29
Jim Handy (D), District 58
Norman Higgins (I), District 120
Daniel Hobbs (D), District 7
Henry Ingwersen (D), District 10
Christina Riley (D), District 74
Bettyann Sheats (D), District 64

Detailed results

District 1

District 2

District 3

District 4

District 5

District 6

District 7

District 8

District 9

District 10

District 11

District 12

District 13

District 14

District 15

District 16

District 17

District 18

District 19

District 20

District 21

District 22

District 23

District 24

District 25

District 26

District 27

District 28

District 29

District 30

District 31

District 32

District 33

District 34

District 35

District 36

District 37

District 38

District 39

District 40

District 41

District 42

District 43

District 44

District 45

District 46

District 47

District 48

District 49

District 50

District 51

District 52

District 53

District 54

District 55

District 56

District 57

District 58

District 59

District 60

District 61

District 62

District 63

District 64

District 65

District 66

District 67

District 68

District 69

District 70

District 71

District 72

District 73

District 74

District 75

District 76

District 77

District 78

District 79

District 80

District 81

District 82

District 83

District 84

District 85

District 86

District 87

District 88

District 89

District 90

District 91

District 92

District 93

District 94

District 95

District 96

District 97

District 98

District 99

District 100

District 101

District 102

District 103

District 104

District 105

District 106

District 107

District 108

District 109

District 110

District 111

District 112

District 113

District 114

District 115

District 116

District 117

District 118

District 119

District 120

District 121

District 122

District 123

District 124

District 125

District 126

District 127

District 128

District 129

District 130

District 131

District 132

District 133

District 134

District 135

District 136

District 137

District 138

District 139

District 140

District 141

District 142

District 143

District 144

District 145

District 146

District 147

District 148

District 149

District 150

District 151

Source:

See also
2020 Maine elections
Passamaquoddy
Maliseet
2020 Maine State Senate election
2020 United States elections
Maine House of Representatives
Maine Senate
2020 United States House of Representatives elections in Maine
2020 United States Senate election in Maine

Notes

External links
Ballotpedia: Maine House of Representatives elections, 2020
 Elections & Voting division of the Maine Secretary of State
 
  (State affiliate of the U.S. League of Women Voters)

References 

House of Representatives
Maine House of Representatives elections
Maine House of Representatives